Francisco Juan Vacas Navarro (born 21 November 1979 in Córdoba, Andalusia), commonly known as Curro Vacas, is a Spanish former professional footballer who played as a central midfielder.

External links

1979 births
Living people
Footballers from Córdoba, Spain
Spanish footballers
Association football midfielders
Segunda División players
Segunda División B players
Tercera División players
Divisiones Regionales de Fútbol players
Córdoba CF B players
CD Numancia players
Zamora CF footballers
Atlético Madrid B players
Racing de Ferrol footballers
Polideportivo Ejido footballers
Lucena CF players
UB Conquense footballers